The Fourth Estate is a four-part 2018 documentary series about The New York Times coverage of the White House, directed by Liz Garbus. A 90-minute version was shown on April 28, 2018 at the Tribeca Film Festival and was followed by a panel discussion with Dean Baquet, Elisabeth Bumiller, Julie Davis, Mark Mazzetti, Liz Garbus, and Jenny Carchman. The opening sequence is scored by Trent Reznor and Atticus Ross; the series features variations of songs from Reznor's Ghosts I-IV.

The series was released by Showtime a month later. It combines running office footage with interviews of investigative reporters and their bosses as they go about their work. The title of the series comes from the common term "the Fourth Estate" for the press' role as independent watchdog keeping an eye on the government. The choice of title can be seen as an ironic comment to Trump's statement at the Conservative Political Action Conference on February 24, 2017, that much of the news media is "the enemy of the people": "A few days ago I called the fake news the enemy of the people and they are. They are the enemy of the people."

Episodes

References

External links
 
  on Showtime
 Showtime's ‘Fourth Estate’ shows how the journalism sausage is made on Poynter, May 25, 2018

2018 American television series debuts
2010s American documentary television series
Showtime (TV network) original programming
English-language television shows
Television series about journalism
Donald Trump in popular culture